Lucas Boada Gómez (1893 - death date unknown) was a Cuban baseball pitcher in the Negro leagues. 

A native of Matanzas, Cuba, Boada played from 1919 to 1924 with the Cuban Stars (East), and the Cuban Stars (West). He also spent time in the Cuban League with Marianao and Almendares.

References

External links
 and Baseball-Reference Black Baseball stats and Seamheads 

1893 births
Date of birth missing
Year of death unknown
Place of death missing
Almendares (baseball) players
Cuban baseball players
Cuban Stars (East) players
Cuban Stars (West) players
Marianao players
Sportspeople from Matanzas
Baseball pitchers